Tocmoche District is one of nineteen districts of the province Chota in Peru.

References